Tua Pek Kong Temple (also called Sibu Eng Ann Teng Tua Pek Kong) in Sibu, Sarawak, Malaysia is the oldest Chinese temple in the town with a 7-storey pagoda with the temple history dates back to 1850s.

History 
The temple history dates back to early 1850s, and later being mentioned in the Kingdom of Sarawak Government's Report of "Sarawak Gazette" in 1871. In 1897, the temple was rebuilt into a typical Chinese Taoist temple architecture designed with tiled roof, stone block floor and all the decorative purlin and fixtures which were imported from China; the statue of Tua Pek Kong deity was specially sculptured and imported from Xiamen. After the building was completed, the list of donors and details of expenditure were recorded in two pieces of stone tablet which are still well preserved in the temple. On 8 March 1928, Sibu town was destroyed by a big fire with the temple survived and remain unscathed. The temple however destroyed through the World War II despite its deity remained unharmed. After the end of the war, the wooden structure temple was rebuilt.

In 1957, the temple was reconstructed into a concrete structure and was declared open by the then Governor of Sarawak, Sir Anthony Abell. It was a grand occasion for the Sibu Town as the British Royal dignitaries including the Resident attended the ceremony. Another renovation on both wings of the temple was being carried out in 1979 and the roof of temple was changed from "belian" (Eusideroxylon zwageri) wood into concrete with glazed roofing tiles; the ridge or roof and column were decorated with traditional dragon and phoenix statues. In 1982, the temple management committee planning to re-build the rear part and construct a 7-storey pagoda for the worship of the Goddess of Mercy where the plan is being realised in 1987 through the aid from Sarawak state government and the temple worshippers. The new pagoda followed closely the traditional Chinese pagoda architecture and subsequently became one of the landmark for Sibu. The renovated building was declared open in 1989.

References

External links 
 

Pagodas in Malaysia
Chinese-Malaysian culture
Taoist temples in Malaysia
Religious buildings and structures completed in the 1850s
Sibu
Buildings and structures in Sarawak
Tourist attractions in Sarawak
19th-century Taoist temples
Towers completed in the 1850s